William Antonio Torres Cabrera (born May 30, 1981 in San Salvador, El Salvador) is a Salvadoran professional football player, who currently plays as a defender for Once Municipal in the Primera División de Fútbol de El Salvador.

Club career
Nicknamed Pichuta, Torres Cabrera started his professional career at local giants Alianza in 2000 and moved to newly formed San Salvador F.C. in 2003. He then left the club before it was disbanded and joined Águila in 2008. In 2011, he moved back to the capital to play for UES whom he had to leave at the end of a miserable season and he signed up with Once Municipal for the 2012 Clausura.

International career
Torres Cabrera was a gold medal winner at the 2002 Central American and Caribbean Games, a tournament for U-21 national teams, and made his senior debut for El Salvador in a November 2002 friendly match against the United States and has earned a total of 30 caps, scoring no goals. He has represented his country in 3 FIFA World Cup qualification matches and played at the 2003, and 2007 UNCAF Nations Cups as well as at the 2003 CONCACAF Gold Cup.

His final international game was a March 2007 friendly match against Honduras.

References

External links

1981 births
Living people
Sportspeople from San Salvador
Association football defenders
Salvadoran footballers
El Salvador international footballers
2003 UNCAF Nations Cup players
2003 CONCACAF Gold Cup players
2007 UNCAF Nations Cup players
Alianza F.C. footballers
San Salvador F.C. footballers
C.D. Águila footballers
Once Municipal footballers